On 2 January 2023, two Eurocopter EC130s collided mid-air and crashed near Sea World theme park in the city of Gold Coast, Queensland, Australia. The collision killed four people and injured eight (three critically).

Incident 
On 2 January 2023, at approximately 1:59pm AEST, two helicopters operated by Sea World Helicopters collided mid-air below 150 metres whilst one was attempting to land and the other departing from a helipad at Sea World theme park. Both helicopters were undertaking tourist trips for park-goers along the Gold Coast Broadwater, although the operator is not associated with the theme park. 

Less than a minute after take-off, the departing helicopter (registration VH-XKQ) was struck in the tail by an arriving helicopter (registration VH-XH9). This resulted in the departing helicopter’s main rotor blades and gearbox separating, causing the helicopter to crash on a sandbar, killing four on board including the pilot and leaving three in critical condition. The arriving helicopter was able to stabilise itself after the collision and successfully perform an emergency landing on the same sandbar with substantial damage. All six on board survived without critical injury, with five of the six survivors on the arriving helicopter suffering minor glass shrapnel wounds from the shattered cockpit windshield. 

Many members of the public witnessed the collision, with beachgoers, boaters, and nearby police attending the scene to provide first aid and free injured passengers from the helicopter.

All nine survivors were taken to hospital for further treatment: eight were transported to Gold Coast University Hospital and one was transported to Queensland Children’s Hospital. The three critically injured survivors were on the departing helicopter and included a 33-year-old woman and her nine-year-old son, and a 10-year-old child. The four who died were a 40-year-old pilot, a 36-year-old woman, and a British couple (aged 65 and 57 respectively).

Sea World Helicopters Pty Ltd, the operator of the two helicopters involved, closed until further notice after the incident.

Investigation 
Queensland Police and the Australian Transport Safety Bureau (ATSB) are investigating the collision. Investigators from ATSB offices in Brisbane and Canberra arrived the following day, removing both aircraft from the sandbar and retrieving electronic recording equipment.

Phone footage aired by Seven News and obtained by a passenger of the arriving helicopter shows a passenger pointing at the departing helicopter, tapping pilot Michael James on his shoulder and grabbing hold of his seat moments before the collision. Footage from three lipstick cameras attached to the departing helicopter will also be examined by the ATSB.

The Bureau is investigating whether the pilots could see the other helicopter, radio calls made by the pilots and whether they could be heard by the other aircraft, operator procedures and regulatory approvals.

See also 
List of accidents and incidents involving helicopters
List of civilian mid-air collisions
2015 Villa Castelli mid-air collision

References

External links 

ATSB preliminary report

Aviation accidents and incidents in Queensland
Accidents and incidents involving the Eurocopter EC130
Mid-air collisions
Mid-air collisions involving helicopters
January 2023 events in Australia
2020s in Queensland
G
2023 disasters in Australia
History of Gold Coast, Queensland